Herbert Ferlando Schwarz (7 September 1883 – 2 October 1960) was an American entomologist who specialised in Hymenoptera.
He was appointed a research associate at the American Museum of Natural History in 1921, a position he held until his death, and was the editor of Natural History magazine from 1921 to 1925.

Schwarz described numerous stingless bee (Meliponini) genera such as Plebeia and Partamona.

Tributes
The bee genera Schwarziana and Schwarzula are named after him.

References

External links

American entomologists
1883 births
1960 deaths
20th-century American zoologists